The WCHL Tournament was an ice hockey tournament for the Worcester Collegiate Hockey League hosted from 1967 to 1972.

History
The WCHL tournament began in 1967, at the end of the first season of league play. The teams with the four best conference records were arranged in a Single-elimination tournament where the winner was declared champion. In 1971 the league dropped from 5 to 4 members and the playoff was changed; the top 2 teams would play a two-game series where the team with the most goals scored was declared the champion. The following year the conference playoff became a single-game championship.

1967

Note: * denotes overtime period(s)

1968

Note: * denotes overtime period(s)

1969

Note: * denotes overtime period(s)

1970

Note: * denotes overtime period(s)

1971

Note: * denotes overtime period(s)

1972

Note: * denotes overtime period(s)

See also
ECAC 2 Tournament

References

Ice hockey articles needing expert attention
Ice hockey